Dennis Harvey Abgrall (born April 24, 1953) is a Canadian former professional ice hockey player. He played 13 games in the National Hockey League and 145 games in World Hockey Association between 1975 and 1978. Abgrall was born in Moosomin, Saskatchewan.

He was previously employed as a French teacher at the Arizona School for the Arts.

Playing career
Dennis Abgrall was drafted by the Los Angeles Kings of the NHL in the 1973 NHL Amateur Draft in the fifth round, 70th overall and by the Los Angeles Sharks of the WHA in the 1973 WHA Amateur Draft in the fifth round, 60th overall.

Abgrall didn't break into either league, though, until he played 13 games for the Kings in the 1975–76 season. Those 13 games would be his only in the NHL and on June 1, 1976, the Cincinnati Stingers of the WHA signed him to a contract. He would play two seasons, 1976–77 and 1977–78, for the Stingers. The Winnipeg Jets selected Abgrall from the Kings in the 1979 NHL Expansion Draft, although he would never play for that organization. His playing career would end with two seasons in various European leagues.

Teaching career
Dennis Abgrall currently teaches various levels of French at North High School. Prior to North High School, Abgrall taught English at Desert Vista High School. He also taught French at Arizona School for the Arts as well as Ironwood High School.

Career statistics

Regular season and playoffs

References

External links
 
 

1953 births
Living people
Binghamton Dusters players
Canadian ice hockey right wingers
Canadian people of Breton descent
Cincinnati Stingers players
EC Bad Tölz players
Erie Blades players
Fort Worth Texans players
Los Angeles Kings draft picks
Los Angeles Kings players
Los Angeles Sharks draft picks
Moose Jaw Canucks players
People from Moosomin, Saskatchewan
Portland Buckaroos players
Saskatoon Blades players
Springfield Indians players